Thomas Isaac Ball was  Provost of Cathedral of The Isles and Collegiate Church of the Holy Spirit, Millport, Isle of Cumbrae from 1892 until his death on 3 August 1916.

Ball was ordained in 1866 and served curacies and incumbencies in Edinburgh.

He lived in a flat at 12 Hill Square in Edinburgh's South Side.

References

Clergy from London
Alumni of the University of Aberdeen
Provosts of the Cathedral of The Isles
1916 deaths